Evje og Vegusdal is a former municipality in the old Aust-Agder county in Norway. The  municipality existed from 1838 until its dissolution in 1877. It was located in the Setesdal region in parts of the present-day municipalities of Evje og Hornnes and Birkenes. The administrative centre was the village of Evje where the Evje Church is located.

History
The parish of Evje og Vegusdal was established as a municipality on 1 January 1838 (see formannskapsdistrikt law). According to the 1835 census the municipality had a population of 1,627. On 1 January 1877, Evje og Vegusdal was divided to create two separate municipalities: Evje with a population of 870 and Vegusdal with a population of 935. These two municipalities later became parts of Evje og Hornnes and Birkenes respectively.

Name
The municipality (originally the parish) of Evje og Vegusdal is named after the farms Evje and Vegusdal.  The old Evje farm is where the first Evje Church was built.  The name is identical with the word  which means "eddy", probably referring to the river Otra that runs past it.  The old Vegusdal farm is derived from the old male name, Veikolfr meaning "weak Ullfr" and the second part is the word dalr which means "valley", hence the "valley of weak Ullfr".

See also
List of former municipalities of Norway

References

External links

Former municipalities of Norway
Evje og Hornnes
Birkenes
1838 establishments in Norway
1877 disestablishments in Norway